Monster is the debut extended play by Red Velvet – Irene & Seulgi, the first sub-unit of South Korean girl group Red Velvet. It was released on July 6, 2020, by SM Entertainment, with Dreamus serving as the South Korea distributor. The EP contains six tracks, including the title track of the same name and a follow-up single "Naughty".

Background and release 
On April 21, 2020, SM Entertainment confirmed that Irene and Seulgi would form Red Velvet's first sub-unit and that the duo was in preparation for their first major release in around June 2020. The release of the mini album was postponed from June 15 to July 6, 2020, on the grounds that it needed additional production on the album, in order to achieve a higher quality of music. The physical release contains two different versions with a CD, a photo booklet, a lyric book and collectibles.

Commercial performance 
According to Hanteo, Monster sold over 80,000 copies on its first day of availability, beating Red Velvet's first day and first week album sales records of the group's sixth extended play The ReVe Festival: Day 1, which set the record at 45,080 copies for its first day, and 71,431 copies for its first week. It also became the best-selling girl group sub-unit album of all time, surpassing Twinkle (2012) by Girls' Generation-TTS. The EP reached 100,000 copies sold on Hanteo in under 3 days, making it the first Red Velvet album to do so.

The EP debuted at number five on the Billboard World Album Chart, becoming the duo's top-five entry.

Track listing 

Notes:
 "Naughty" is only available in the EP as a CD-only track. It was omitted from the digital release of the EP until July 20, 2020, when it was released on Korean music sites as part of the EP and as a standalone digital single in international music sites.

Credits and personnel 
Credits adapted from the liner notes of the EP.

Musicians

 Red Velvet – Irene & Seulgi
 Irenevocals , background vocals 
 Seulgivocals , background vocals 
 KenzieKorean lyrics 
 JQ (makeumine works)Korean lyrics 
 Lee Yeon-ji (makeumine works)Korean lyrics 
 Kim Yeon-seoKorean lyrics , composition , background vocals 
 Lee Seu-ranKorean lyrics 
 Park Green (153/Joombas)Korean lyrics 
 Yaakov "Yash" Gruzmancomposition , arrangement , drums , keyboards & synths 
 Delaney Janecomposition , background vocals 
 Jenson Vaughncomposition 
 Yoo Young-jincomposition , arrangement 
 Moonshinecomposition , arrangement 
 Louise Frick Sveencomposition , background vocals 
 Charite Vikencomposition , background vocals 
 Daniel "Obi" Kleincomposition , arrangement 
 Andreas Öbergcomposition , guitar 
Tania Dokocomposition 
Maribellecomposition 
MinGtioncomposition , arrangement , piano , bass 
Andrew Choicomposition 
Joseph Hongcomposition , arrangement 
Jae Shimcomposition 
Krizbackground vocals 
Seo Mi-raebackground vocals 

Technical

 Yoo Young-jindirecting , recording , digital editing , mixing engineer , mixing 
 Kenziedirecting 
 ButterFlyvocal directing , Pro Tools operation , digital editing 
 Kim Yeon-seodirecting 
 Krizvocal directing 
 Jeong Eui-seokrecording , mixing 
 Noh Min-jirecording , mixing engineer 
 Kim Cheol-soonrecording , mixing 
 Lee Ji-hongrecording , digital editing , mixing engineer , mixing 
 Jung Yoo-radigital editing 
 Lee Min-kyudigital editing , mixing engineer , mixing 
 MinGtiondigital editing 
 Namkoong Jinmixing 
 Cheon Hoonmastering 
 Kwon Nam-woomastering

Charts

Weekly charts

Monthly charts

Year-end charts

Certifications and sales

Release history

References 

2020 debut EPs
Red Velvet (group) EPs
SM Entertainment EPs
Korean-language EPs
IRiver EPs